The General Directorate of Security (DGS) was a Portuguese criminal police body active between 1969 and 1974, during the last years of the Estado Novo dictatorship.

Although their duties included, in addition to state security, the supervision of foreigners, border control, and the fight against illegal trafficking of migrants, historically the DGS was essentially a secret police responsible for repression, without judicial control, of all forms of political opposition to the Estado Novo.

The DGS was created in 1969 to succeed to the International and State Defense Police (PIDE), by Decree-Law no. 49 401, of November 24, 1969, of the government of Marcello Caetano. It was disbanded in the continent and islands in 1974, following the Revolution of April 25 that ended the Estado Novo, by Decree-Law no. 171/74 of April 25. In overseas territories it continued to exist until 1975, under the designation of "Military Intelligence Police".

Organisation
In 1974, the General Directorate of Security was organized as follows:
Directorate 
Director-General
Subdirector-General
Inspector-Supervisors
Superior Technical Council
Board of the Director-General
Board of Administrators
1st Directorate (Directorate of Information Services)
Information and Counter-Information Division 
Telecommunications Division 
File Section
2nd Directorate (Directorate for Investigation and Litigation Services)
Division of Investigation
Technical Divisions (identification services) 
Prison Section
Litigation (including Legal Consultancy)
National Office of Interpol
3rd Directorate (Directorate of Foreigners and Borders Services)
Division of Foreigners
Border Division
4th Directorate (Directorate of Administrative Services)
Division of Personnel
Division of General Services 
Accounting Section 
Treasury Section 
General Archive
Secretariat of Defense of War Facilities and Material
Technical School
Delegations (Luanda, Lourenço Marques, Coimbra and Porto)
Subdelegations
Surveillance Posts
Border posts

References

External links
PIDE Documentation of PIDE/DGS in the National Archive (in Portuguese)

Portuguese intelligence agencies
National security institutions
PIDE
Defunct law enforcement agencies of Portugal
Estado Novo (Portugal)
1969 establishments in Portugal
1974 disestablishments in Portugal